Karim Diaa Eddine is an Egyptian film director and actor from Cairo. A business graduate of the American University of Cairo, he worked as an assistant director in France for three years. Notable films include Loves and Terror (1992), Ismailia Round Trip (1997), Hassan and Aziza:State Security Case (1999) and In Arabic, Cindarella (2006).

References

Director Karim Diaa El Din passed away

Film directors from Cairo
Male actors from Cairo
Living people
The American University in Cairo alumni
Year of birth missing (living people)